The Wake Island Time Zone observes standard time by adding twelve hours to Coordinated Universal Time (UTC+12:00). The clock time in this zone is based on the mean solar time of the 180th degree meridian east of the Greenwich Observatory.

The zone includes the U.S. territory of Wake Island and is two hours ahead of Chamorro Time Zone, 17 hours ahead of North American Eastern Time Zone, 23 hours ahead of Samoa Time Zone, and 24 hours ahead of Howland and Baker Islands.

See also
Time zone
Time offset
Chamorro Time Zone
UTC-12
Samoa Time Zone
Hawaii-Aleutian Time Zone
Alaska Time Zone
Pacific Time Zone
Mountain Time Zone
Central Time Zone
Eastern Time Zone
Atlantic Time Zone
Newfoundland Time Zone

Sources
 Current time around the world

External links
Current Wake Island Time

Time zones
Wake Island
Time zones in the United States